General Phillips may refer to:

Edward Phillips (British Army officer) (1889–1973), British Army major general
Leslie Gordon Phillips (1892–1966), British Army major general
Owen Phillips (general) (1882–1966), Australian Army major general
Samuel C. Phillips (1921–1990), U.S. Air Force general
William Phillips (British Army officer) (1731–1781), British Army major general in the American Revolutionary War

See also
Attorney General Phillips (disambiguation)
General Philipps (disambiguation)